Vittorio Nino Novarese (May 15, 1907 in Rome, Italy – October 17, 1983 in Los Angeles, United States) was an Italian costume designer who found great success in Hollywood after decamping there in 1949. In his first year there he scored an Oscar nomination for his work on the film Prince of Foxes, winning the Academy Award 14 years later for the grandiose epic Cleopatra. He was also nominated twice in 1965 for both The Agony and the Ecstasy and The Greatest Story Ever Told, and won a second Oscar in 1970 for Cromwell.

Novarese was trained as a militarist, but contrary to what one might think from the name, this only gave him the classical training to know how soldiers of different ranks were dressed and armed throughout history.

His daughter is the actress Letícia Román who starred with John Saxon in The Girl Who Knew Too Much and with Elvis Presley in G.I. Blues.

Selected filmography
 Ettore Fieramosca (1938)
 Marco Visconti (1941)
 Fury (1947)
 Prelude to Madness (1948)
 Hand of Death (1949)
 Women and Brigands (1950)
 Messalina (1951)
 Lorenzaccio (1951)
 The Rival of the Empress (1951)
 The Adventures of Mandrin (1952)
 Too Young for Love (1953)
 House of Ricordi (1954)
 Orient Express (1954)
 Mata Hari's Daughter (1954)
 Captain Falcon (1958)
 Conspiracy of the Borgias (1959)

External links

1907 births
1983 deaths
Best Costume Design Academy Award winners
Italian emigrants to the United States